The Estación de Madrid-Chamartín Clara Campoamor or Madrid Chamartín is the second major railway station in Madrid, Spain. Located on the northern side of the city, it was built between 1970 and 1975, but more work was carried on into the early 1980s. It then superseded Atocha station, which is located just south of the city centre. However, as the AVE network expanded with a hub at Atocha, Chamartin again became Madrid's second station by passenger volume.

It hosts the railway networks connecting Madrid and north-western Spain, the AVE (high-speed line) from Madrid to Segovia, Valladolid and León and many Cercanías lines (commuter rail), as well as the international line to Lisbon. There are also connections with Atocha. Under the railway station is Chamartín Metro Station, linking with lines 1 and 10 of the Madrid Metro, also for travelling to Madrid City Centre.

Renfe trains platforms and destinations 

Chamartín Renfe train station has 21 platforms, numbered West to East.

Most of the trains attach to the following platforms:

Services

Long-distance trains

Regional trains

Cercanías Madrid

Metro Station 
The Chamartín metro station connects Lines 1 and 10, and is located directly below the railway station, accessible by a short sheltered outdoor passage. It has four levels: two mezzanines, and two track levels, with mezzanines between track levels. The upper mezzanine has a few shops and fare gates to enter the station proper, and is connected to the exit. The lower mezzanine currently serves as a way for riders to change direction on either line.

References

External links
Transport of Madrid official 
Renfe commuter trains times
Renfe Long Distance trains times
Madrid train services visitor guide (English)

Line 1 (Madrid Metro) stations
Line 10 (Madrid Metro) stations
Cercanías Madrid stations
Railway stations in Madrid
Railway stations in Spain opened in 1967
Transit centers in Spain